Guatemala competed at the 2022 World Games held in Birmingham, United States from 7 to 17 July 2022. Athletes representing Guatemala won one silver medal and the country finished in 63rd place in the medal table.

Medalists

Competitors
The following is the list of number of competitors in the Games.

Racquetball

Guatemala won one silver medal in racquetball.

Road speed skating

Guatemala competed in road speed skating.

Track speed skating

Guatemala competed in track speed skating.

References

Nations at the 2022 World Games
2022
World Games